Evert Musch (Groningen, March 16, 1918 - Anloo, December 5, 2007) was a Dutch painter.

Early life
Musch studied at Academie Minerva (1936–1940) in his hometown Groningen, where he studied under ,  Kort and C.P. de Wit. From 1947 to 1981, Musch was lecturer at the Academy Minerva, succeeding his former teacher De Wit.
Musch married in 1943 painter Johanna (To) Jager, whom he had met at Academy Minerva. Musch was a member of the artists movement "De Jongeren" (1941–1942) and of the "Drentse Schilders" (1947–1953). In 1954 he was co-founder of the "Drents Schilders Genootschap".

Later life
The Drents Museum in Assen held a retrospective of his work in 1988.

Themes and style
Musch made oil paintings and watercolors and his subjects include landscapes and portraits in naturalistic-impressionistic style. He also worked as a lithographer and illustrator of books, including "Kinderen in verstand en boosheid", by the writer .

References

External links

 
 Encyclopedie Drenthe Online

Painters from Groningen
1918 births
2007 deaths
20th-century Dutch painters
Dutch male painters
20th-century Dutch male artists